The 17th Annual Nickelodeon Kids' Choice Awards was held on April 3, 2004. The event was hosted by Mike Myers and Cameron Diaz to promote Shrek 2. This would be the first time the award show was held at the Pauley Pavilion since 1999. The ceremony is also notable as leading into "Mystery Meat", the pilot episode and first airing of the animated series Danny Phantom.

Celebrity appearances
People who appeared in the ceremony: 
Mike Myers, Cameron Diaz, Mischa Barton, Drake Bell, Amanda Bynes, Nick Cannon, Jim Carrey, Ellen DeGeneres,  Hilary Duff, Kirsten Dunst, Jennifer Garner, Anne Hathaway, Tony Hawk, Jennifer Love Hewitt, Mat Hoffman, Hugh Jackman, Queen Latifah, Avril Lavigne,  Lindsay Lohan, George Lopez, Jennifer Lopez, Tobey Maguire, Ben McKenzie, Frankie Muniz, Ashley & Mary-Kate Olsen, Josh Peck, Raven Symoné, Joe Rogan, Adam Sandler, David Spade, Jamie Lynn Spears,  Justin Timberlake, Serena Williams, the American Idol (season 3) top 9 finalists, and OutKast.

Winners and nominees
Winners are listed first, in bold.

Movies

Television

Music

Sports

Others

Wannabe Award
Adam Sandler

Best Burp
Hugh Jackman

References

External links
 
 Kids' Choice Awards 2004 Press Kit 

Nickelodeon Kids' Choice Awards
Kids' Choice Awards
Kids' Choice Awards
Kids
2004 in Los Angeles